Mexicana Universal Campeche is a pageant in Campeche, Mexico, that selects that state's representative for the national Mexicana Universal pageant.

The State Organization has produced one winner for Miss World in 2001 being the first and only winner from the state to win a crown of Nuestra Belleza México.

Mexicana Universal Campeche is located at number 17 with one crown of Nuestra Belleza México/Mexicana Universal.

Titleholders
Below are the names of the annual titleholders of Mexicana Universal Campeche, listed in ascending order, and their final placements in the Mexicana Universal after their participation, until 2017 the names are as Nuestra Belleza Campeche.

 Competed in Miss Universe.
 Competed in Miss World.
 Competed in Miss International.
 Competed in Miss Charm International.
 Competed in Miss Continente Americano.
 Competed in Reina Hispanoamericana.
 Competed in Miss Orb International.
 Competed in Nuestra Latinoamericana Universal.

Designated Contestants
As of 2000, isn't uncommon for some States to have more than one delegate competing simultaneously in the national pageant. The following Nuestra Belleza Campeche contestants were invited to compete in Nuestra Belleza México.

External links
Official Website

Nuestra Belleza México